Marstonia ozarkensis, common name the Ozark pyrg, is a species of very small or minute freshwater snails with an operculum, aquatic gastropod mollusks in the family Hydrobiidae. This species was endemic to the United States and was presumed extinct by the U.S. Fish and Wildlife Service as of December 2018.

This species was named after the Ozarks, a highland region of the United States.

References

Molluscs of the United States
Hydrobiidae
Gastropods described in 1915
Taxonomy articles created by Polbot
Taxobox binomials not recognized by IUCN